Happy You and Merry Me is a 1936 Fleischer Studios animated short film featuring Betty Boop and Pudgy the Puppy.

Plot summary
A stray kitten called Myron wanders into Betty Boop's house, gets sick on candy, and is cured with catnip by Betty and Pudgy the Pup.

References

External links
Happy You and Merry Me on Youtube
Happy You and Merry Me at IMDb
 Happy You and Merry Me at the Big Cartoon DataBase

1936 films
Betty Boop cartoons
1930s American animated films
1936 animated films
Paramount Pictures short films
Fleischer Studios short films
Short films directed by Dave Fleischer
Animated films about dogs
Animated films about cats
American black-and-white films